The eleventh season of The Real Housewives of Orange County, an American reality television series, is broadcast on Bravo. It aired June 20, 2016, until November 21, 2016, and is primarily filmed in Orange County, California. Its executive producers are Adam Karpel, Alex Baskin, Douglas Ross, Gregory Stewart, Scott Dunlop, Stephanie Boyriven and Andy Cohen.

The Real Housewives of Orange County focuses on the lives of Vicki Gunvalson, Tamra Judge, Heather Dubrow, Shannon Beador, Meghan King Edmonds and Kelly Dodd. It consisted of 21 episodes

Production and crew
The renewal of the eleventh season of The Real Housewives of Orange County was announced in April 2016. In May 2016, the official premier date, cast and trailer were revealed.
The season premiere "When the Ship Hits the Fan" was aired on June 20, 2016.
while the eighteenth episode "Vicious Lies and Broken Ties" served as the season finale, and was aired on October 31, 2016. It was followed by a three-part reunion that aired on November 7, November, 14 and November 21, 2016, which marked the conclusion of the season.
Adam Karpel, Alex Baskin, Douglas Ross, Gregory Stewart, Scott Dunlop, Stephanie Boyriven and Andy Cohen are recognized as the series' executive producers; it is produced and distributed by Evolution Media.

Cast and synopsis
All five wives featured on the tenth season returned for season eleven. Season ten recurring cast member and former housewife, Lizzie Rovsek departed the series and did not return for season eleven.
Joining the series in the eleventh season is Kelly Dodd, an Arizona native who's a stay-at home mom currently working through her marital issues. Dodd is described as "bold and brash" as well as "her fiery Latin lineage and unfiltered opinions definitely bring the heat to the OC."

Vicki Gunvalson attempts to mend the fractured friendship from last year's drama regarding Brooks Ayers. Tamra Judge and Heather Dubrow reluctantly accept Gunvalson's apologies however Shannon Beador is less receptive with mending the friendship. Vicki's daughter moves back to Orange County from Oklahoma after Gunvalson buys her a home. The return isn't all it's meant to be as Briana recovers from surgery and Gunvalson's grandmother duties are on overdrive.
Judge feels in the middle of her son Ryan's relationship with Sarah and attempts to salvage it.
Dubrow continues with the construction of her home and she also continues to struggles with her workaholic husband and his inability to step away from work. The Dubrow family take a trip to Turk and Caicos to reconnect however once home the children still notice the distance. Dubrow gives Terry some tough advice and her opinion on his choices. Dubrow balances home and business as and launches her new book.
The evening Dodd is introduced to the other wives through Edmonds, on Dubrow's boat party, she feels Beador is quite reserved and slightly judgmental. After connecting with Gunvalson at the party, Dodd and Vicki start to connect despite Edmonds warnings. After an argument with Beador, Edmonds give Dodd some tough love.
Beador relishes in her marriage being the most solid it has been in years and continues to build on it. Strengthening their marriage, Beador's husband David surprises Beador with a vow renewal ceremony. The Beadors look for a new home. At Beador's 1970s-themed party, Beador gets into a huge argument with Dodd about rumors of the past. At the same party, Beador's husband finds himself in an argument with Gunvalson, also arguing about the past. Despite attempts of reconciliation, the two wives continue to feud. The behavior Dodd displayed during one of her and Beador's arguments has Dubrow not wanting to associate with Dodd ever again but Judge is determined to have the two work out their differences.
Meghan King Edmonds begins IVF however it's her mum by her side instead of her husband due to his work commitments. During her IVF treatment, Edmonds seeks out support from Dodd and Dubrow, who have also gone through IVF. Edmonds begins the renovations on her new Orange County home.

Episodes

References

External links

 
 
 

2016 American television seasons
Orange County (season 11)